Prüfstand VII is a 2002 German docudrama film by Robert Bramkamp, about the V-2 rocket and the rocket research in the Peenemünde Army Research Center. The film deals with the history of ideas surrounding the rocket research and the conquest of space, with Bianca as the spirit of the rocket guiding the viewer around different aspects of rocket research. It is partly inspired by Thomas Pynchon's novel Gravity's Rainbow and features dramatization of some selected scenes from the novel.

Cast
 Hanjo Berressem
 Inga Busch as Bianca
 Jeff Caster as Pointsman
 Robert Forster as Fährmann
 Matthias Fuchs
 Stefan Heidenreich
 Helmut Höge
 Peter Lohmeyer
 Mario Mentrup
 Michael Röhrenbach

References

External links
 Official website
 

2000s German-language films
2000s German films
2000s war drama films
German docudrama films
German war drama films
German World War II films
Thomas Pynchon